Elections to Burnley Borough Council in Lancashire, England were held on 1 May 2003.  One third of the council was up for election with a by-election in the Whittlefield with Ightenhill ward. The British National Party won the popular vote and gained the most seats, although the Labour party retained overall control of the council.

After the election, the composition of the council was
Labour 24
British National Party 8
Liberal Democrat 7
Conservative 3
 Others 3

Election result

Ward results

References

BBC News 2002 Burnley Election Results Accessed 2010
Local Council Election Results Archive 2003 Accessed 2010

2003 English local elections
2003
2000s in Lancashire